This is a list of college football head coaches with non-consecutive tenure, meaning that an individual was a head coach at a college or university for a period, departed, and then returned to the same college or university in the same capacity.

This list includes only head coaches. This list does not include the following:
 Head coaches whose break in tenure was due to a temporarily suspended football program with no other coach during the break in tenure. Most such cases involve programs that halted play for World War I (including the flu pandemic linked to that conflict), World War II, or COVID-19. Another recent example is Bill Clark, head coach at UAB since 2014. UAB dropped football after his first season at the school, but announced six months later that it would reinstate the sport, eventually resuming play in 2017. Clark was under contract to UAB throughout the program's hiatus.
 Coaches who left and returned to an administrative capacity in the title of "head coach" but did not coach any games, such as when Tom Osborne temporarily named himself head coach while athletic director for the Nebraska Cornhuskers until Bo Pelini was hired in 2007.
 Coaches whose break in tenure was due to a medical or personal leave, with no new permanent head coach having been hired. A recent example is Joe Moglia, head coach at Coastal Carolina from 2012 to 2018. He went on a medical leave shortly before the 2017 season, and returned to coaching in 2018. During the 2017 season, offensive coordinator Jamey Chadwell was interim head coach, but was not hired as the permanent replacement at that time; he would succeed Moglia after the latter retired after the 2018 season.
 Coaches who were hired as interim head coaches while the permanent head coach was on a personal or medical leave, such as Chadwell.

Several College Football Hall of Fame coaches have made the list, accenting not only their return to the same program but the success their return brought to the program.  Critics have pointed out that returning coaches appear to be less successful at producing winning teams and programs during their second tenure and make comparisons to previous records of coaches attempting to return to a prior coaching job.

Footnotes

References